Bandixon is an urban-type settlement in Bandixon District, Surxondaryo Region, Uzbekistan. It is the administrative center of Bandixon District.

References

Populated places in Surxondaryo Region
Urban-type settlements in Uzbekistan